Stone Age Romeos is a 1955 short subject directed by Jules White starring American slapstick comedy team The Three Stooges (Moe Howard, Larry Fine and Shemp Howard). It is the 163rd entry in the series released by Columbia Pictures starring the comedians, who released 190 shorts for the studio between 1934 and 1959.

Plot
The Stooges hope to collect a reward by proving to museum curator B. Bopper (Emil Sitka) that cavemen indeed still exist. They embark on an expedition with 16mm camera in hand, ready to film whatever they find. Eventually, the Stooges return to Bopper with a film showing three cavemen living in the prehistoric age. The film illustrates the three tending to their daily chores, consisting of mixing milk, hunting fish, and gathering eggs. The film also shows the three cavemen defending their women from other fellow cavemen. Bopper is ecstatic, and is preparing to cut the Stooges a check. However, Bopper overhears the sneaky Stooges talking about how the film was a hoax, as they played the cavemen themselves. The curator is furious, and promptly shoots the three frauds in their derrieres, before shooting himself in the foot.

Cast

Credited
 Moe Howard as Moe
 Larry Fine as Larry
 Shemp Howard as Shemp
 Emil Sitka as B. Bopper
 Dee Green as Baggie (stock footage)
 Virginia Hunter as Aggie (stock footage)
 Nancy Saunders as Maggie (stock footage)

Uncredited
 Barbara Bartay as Secretary
 Joe Palma as Caveman (stock footage)
 Cy Schindell as Caveman (stock footage)
 Bill Wallace as Caveman (stock footage)
 Heinie Conklin as Milkman (stock footage)

Production notes
Stone age romeos is a remake of 1948's I'm a Monkey's uncle using ample stock footage from the original film. New footage was filmed on August 26, 1954.

See also
List of American films of 1955

References

External links 
 
 
Stone Age Romeos at threestooges.net

1955 films
1955 comedy films
The Three Stooges films
American black-and-white films
The Three Stooges film remakes
Films directed by Jules White
Columbia Pictures short films
1950s English-language films
1950s American films
American comedy short films